Duji may refer to:

Duji Circuit (都畿道), circuit of the Tang Dynasty, centred on modern Luoyang
Duji District (杜集区), Huaibei, Anhui, China
Duji, Yucheng County (杜集镇), town in Yucheng County, Henan, China
Duji, Ningjin County, Shandong (杜集镇), town in Ningjin County, Shandong, China
Duji, Nigeria, a small town in northern Nigeria